This article displays the squads for the 2018 European Men's Handball Championship. Each team consists of up to 28 players, of whom 16 may be fielded for each match.

Age, club, caps and goals as of 12 January 2018.

Group A

Croatia
A 22-player squad was announced on 31 December 2017. The final squad was revealed on 11 January 2018. Two days later, Domagoj Duvnjak has been replaced by Denis Buntić due to an injury in the match against Serbia. Ivan Pešić replaced Mirko Alilović on 16 January 2018. Two days later, Marino Marić replaced Denis Buntić. Alilović rejoined the squad on 20 January 2018 and replaced Ivan Pešić. Igor Vori and Jakov Gojun were replaced six days later by Tin Kontrec and Halil Jaganjac.

Head coach: Lino Červar

Iceland
The squad was announced on 16 December 2017.

Head coach: Geir Sveinsson

Serbia
The squad was announced on 11 January 2018. Nikola Crnoglavac replaced Marko Vujin on 16 January 2018 due to an injury. Dobrivoje Marković was replaced by Darko Stevanović six days later. Vanja Ilić was added to the squad on 24 January 2018 to replace Milan Jovanović.

Head coach: Jovica Cvetković

Sweden
The squad was announced on 21 December 2017. Viktor Östlund replaced Johan Jakobsson on 24 January 2018. Two days later, Albin Lagergren was replaced by Andreas Cederholm.

Head coach: Kristján Andrésson

Group B

Austria
A 17-player squad was announced on 26 December 2017. On 15 January 2018, Alexander Hermann was replaced by Thomas Kandolf due to an injury.

Head coach: Patrekur Jóhannesson

Belarus
The squad was announced on 26 December 2017. On 4 January 2018, 17 players were called up and 18 six days later. Hleb Harbuz was replaced by Mikalai Aliokhin on 22 January 2018.

Head coach: Yuri Shevtsov

France
A 21-player squad was announced on 8 December 2017. It was down to 20, after Olivier Nyokas left the team with an injury on 29 December 2017. The final squad was revealed on 8 January 2018. Romain Lagarde and Luka Karabatić replaced Timothey N'Guessan and Benjamin Afgour on 20 January 2018. Benjamin Afgour and Luka Karabatić rejoined the squad in favour of Timothey N'Guessan and Dika Mem on 28 January 2018.

Head coach: Didier Dinart/Guillaume Gille

Norway
An 18-player squad was announced on 19 December 2017. The final squad was revealed on 11 January 2018. On 16 January 2018, Joakim Hykkerud replaced Espen Lie Hansen in the squad. Two days later, Lie Hansen replaced Hykkerud. Espen Christensen was replaced by Kristian Sæverås on 24 January 2018.

Head coach: Christian Berge

Group C

Germany
A 20-player squad was announced on 15 December 2017. The final squad was revealed on 7 January 2018. On 17 January 2018, Bastian Roscheck was replaced by Finn Lemke. Rune Dahmke replaced Maximilian Janke three days later. Paul Drux was forced to leave due to an injury with Maximilian Janke replacing him on 22 January 2018.

Head coach: Christian Prokop

North Macedonia
A 21-player squad was announced on 14 December 2017. It was reduced to 19 on 10 January 2018. Filip Lazarov was injured on 17 January 2018 and replaced by Velko Markoski. Nikola Markoski was replaced after Filip Lazarov rejoined the squad four days later. Goce Ojleski replaced Kiril Lazarov on 24 January 2018.

Head coach: Raúl González

Montenegro
A 20-player squad was announced on 22 December 2017. Mile Mijušković was replaced by Nebojša Simić on 15 January 2018. Mirko Radović replaced Žarko Pejović two days later.

Head coach: Dragan Đukić

Slovenia
A 21-player squad was announced on 14 December 2017. Nik Henigman was replaced by Gregor Potočnik on 15 January 2018. Patrik Leban and Urh Kastelic replaced Jan Grebenc and Urban Lesjak seven days later.

Head coach: Veselin Vujović

Group D

Czech Republic
An 18-player squad was announced on 29 December 2017. The final squad was revealed on 11 January 2018. Peter Šlachta replaced Štěpán Zeman on 21 January 2018. Zeman rejoined the squad three days later to replace Michal Kasal.

Head coach: Jan Filip/Daniel Kubeš

Denmark
The squad was announced on 15 December 2017. Peter Balling replaced Anders Zachariassen on 17 January 2018. Zachariassen rejoined the squad and replaced Niclas Kirkeløkke two days later. Niclas Kirkeløkke and Kevin Møller replaced Rene Toft Hansen and Peter Balling on 28 January 2018.

Head coach: Nikolaj Jacobsen

Hungary
An 18-player squad was announced on 30 December 2017. Uroš Vilovski and Iman Jamali were replaced by Dávid Fekete and Ádám Országh on 17 January 2018.

Head coach: Ljubomir Vranjes

Spain
A 19-player squad was announced on 14 December 2017. It was reduced to 17 on 30 December 2017. Aitor Ariño replaced Ángel Fernández Pérez on 15 January 2018. Two days later, Julen Aguinagalde was replaced by Iosu Goñi Leoz. On 21 January 2018, Julen Aguinagalde rejoined the squad instead of Iosu Goñi Leoz. Iosu Goñi Leoz rejoined the squad on 24 January 2018, replacing Daniel Dujshebaev. Gonzalo Pérez de Vargas was replaced by Arpad Šterbik two days later.

Head coach: Jordi Ribera

References

External links
Official website

Squads
European Handball Championship squads